Airman Magazine is the official magazine of the United States Air Force and reports on information and news about and of interest to Air Force members and their families. It is published bi-monthly online by the Defense Media Activity group. Airman also published The Book annually, a summary of basic Air Force facts, including weapons and aircraft, but discontinued doing so after 2011.

History and profile
Airman was first published in August 1957 as The Airman. The final printed edition was released on September 1, 2011, with its new digital format for September/October 2011 being simultaneously published. The direct predecessor to Airman was called the Air Service Weekly Newsletter, first published on September 21, 1918. Before its cancellation in 1946, its name was changed to Air Corps Weekly Newsletter, Air Force Weekly Newsletter, and finally Air Forces Weekly Newsletter.

References

External links
Airman Magazine official website
Airman Magazine back issues

Aviation magazines
Bimonthly magazines published in the United States
Defunct magazines published in the United States
Magazines established in 1957
Magazines disestablished in 2011
Magazines published in Maryland
Military magazines published in the United States
Online magazines published in the United States
Online magazines with defunct print editions
United States Air Force